Omicron (Ο or ο) is a letter of the Greek alphabet.

Omicron, Omikron, Ο or ο may also refer to:

Science
 SARS-CoV-2 Omicron variant, a variant of the virus that causes COVID-19
 Omicron (wasp), a genus of wasps
 Polynucleobacter necessarius, a bacterium originally designated as Omicron

Other uses
 ο, the number 70 in ancient, Byzantine and modern Greek numerals
 Omicron (film), a 1963 Italian film
 Omicron Hill, a summit in Alaska, US
 Omikron: The Nomad Soul, an adventure video game

See also

 Omikronpapillomavirus, a genus of viruses
 
 
  (omicron)
  (omicron)
 O (disambiguation)
 Omnicron (disambiguation)